Huang Wenbi (April 23, 1893 – December 18, 1966) was a Chinese archaeologist specializing in Xinjiang.

Huang was born in Hanchuan, Hubei Province. After graduating from Peking University in 1918, he became a faculty member of the university. From 1927 to 1930, he participated in the Sino-Swedish Expedition to Inner Mongolia and Xinjiang with Sven Hedin and Xu Xusheng. He was also a research fellow on the Sino-Swedish Expedition of 1934-37.

In 1928 and 1930, he worked in Turfan with other members of Hedin’s expedition, while also studying Gaochang and the cave monasteries, Bezeklik in particular. In 1930, he excavated in Yarqoto, before returning to Gaochang and then moving on to the burial grounds of Astana. A new cycle of work was undertaken in 1933 and then resumed in 1943.

As a member of the Central Committee for the Preservation of Antiquities, he was stationed in Xi'an to be a director to research the Stele Forest from 1935. In 1947, he returned to Beijing, where he  worked in the Institute of Archaeology of the Academy of Sciences of the People’s Republic of China. He conducted a number of further archeological research trips to the western regions from 1950, in particular exploring the historic city of Gaochang. His last expedition to Chinese Turkestan took place in 1958.
 
He died in 1966.

Works 
 Gaochang zhuanji, Peking 1931 
 Gaochang zhuanji zhuiyan, Peking 1931 
 Gaochang taoji 1934 
 Luobu Nao'er kaogu ji (The Exploration around Lob Nor: A report on the exploratory work during 1930 and 1934; Chinese with English translation of the preface and the table of contents), Peking 1948. 
 Gaochang tuanji, Peking 1951. 
 Gaochang zhuanji 1951 
 Talimu Pendi kaogu ji, Peking 1958. 
 Tulufan kaogu ji 1954, 1958 
 Huang Wenbi Meng Xin Kaocha riji 1927–1930 [Huang Wenbi's Mongolia and Xinjiang Survey Diary], Peking: Wenwu chubanshe 1990 
 Xinjiang kaogu fajue baokap, 1983 
 Xibei shi di luncong, 1981
 Gaochang zhuanji, Beijing 1931 
 Gaochang zhuanji zhuiyan, Beijing 1931 
 Gaochang taoji 1934 
 Luobu Nao'er kaogu ji (The Exploration around Praise Nor: A report on the exploratory work during 1930 and 1934, Chinese with English Gaochang tuanji, Beijing 1951. 
 Gaochang zhuanji 1951 
 Talimu Pendi kaogu ji, Beijing 1958. 
 Tulufan kaogu ji 1954, 1958 
 Huang Wenbi Meng Xin Kaocha riji 1927-1930 [Huang Wenbi's Mongolia and Xinjiang Survey Diary], Beijing: Wenwu chubanshe 1990 
 Xinjiang kaogu fajue baokap, 1983 
 Xibei shi di luncong, 1981

References

Further reading
Chinese Collections, International Dunhuang Project
Huang Wenbi: Pioneer of Chinese Archaeology in Xinjian
Sven Hedin's Fourth Expedition, Sven Hedin Foundation

1893 births
1966 deaths
Chinese archaeologists
People from Xiaogan
Scientists from Hubei
20th-century archaeologists